A boom or a chain (also boom defence, harbour chain, river chain, chain boom, boom chain or variants) is an obstacle strung across a navigable stretch of water to control or block navigation.

In modern times they usually have civil uses, such as to prevent access to a dangerous river channel. But, especially historically, they have been used militarily, with the goal of denying access to an enemy's ships: a modern example is the anti-submarine net.

Booms have also been used to force passing vessels to pay a toll.

Description
A boom generally floats on the surface, while a chain can be on the surface or below the water. A chain could be made to float with rafts, logs, ships or other wood, making the chain a boom as well.

Historical uses
Especially in medieval times, the end of a chain could be attached to a chain tower or boom tower. This allowed safe raising or lowering of the chain, as they were often heavily fortified. By raising or lowering a chain or boom, access could be selectively granted rather than simply rendering the stretch of water completely inaccessible. The raising and lowering could be accomplished by a windlass mechanism or a capstan.

Booms or chains could be broken by a sufficiently large or heavy ship, and this occurred on many occasions, including the siege of Damietta, the raid on the Medway and the Battle of Vigo Bay. Frequently, however, attackers instead seized the defences and cut the chain or boom by more conventional methods. The boom at the siege of Derry, for example, was cut by sailors in a longboat.

As a key portion of defences, booms were usually heavily defended. This involved shore-based chain towers, artillery batteries, or forts. In the Age of Sail, a boom protecting a harbour could have several ships defending it with their broadsides, discouraging assaults on the boom. On some occasions, multiple booms spanned a single stretch of water.

Gallery

Examples

Historical

The chain at Fort Blockhouse, protecting Portsmouth Harbour from 1431 to 1539.
The Leonine Wall included a chain blocking the Tiber
A chain spanned the Golden Horn
A chain and boom blocked the River Medway during the Raid on the Medway
Hudson River Chain
The chain blocking the Parana River during the Battle of Vuelta de Obligado
A chain was placed from Columbus, Kentucky across the Mississippi River to Missouri in order to block Union ships during the American Civil War

See also

 Anti-submarine net
 Boom defence vessel - a vessel charged with laying anti-submarine nets
 Log boom - a boom for collecting logs
 Boom (containment) - a boom for containing oil spills

Notes
A. Some sources have the chain being dismantled instead of broken by a ship in the siege of Damietta and in the raid on the Medway.

References

Nautical terminology